Russian(s) refers to anything related to Russia, including:

Russians (russkiye), an ethnic group of the East Slavic peoples, primarily living in Russia and neighboring countries
Rossiyane, Russian language term for all citizens and people of Russia, regardless of ethnicity
Russophone, Russian-speaking person (russkogovoryashchy, russkoyazychny)
Russian language, the most widely spoken of the Slavic languages
Russian alphabet
Russian cuisine
Russian culture
Russian studies

Russian may also refer to:
Russian dressing
The Russians, a book by Hedrick Smith
Russian (comics), fictional Marvel Comics supervillain from The Punisher series
Russian (solitaire), a card game
"Russians" (song), from the album The Dream of the Blue Turtles by Sting
"Russian", from the album Tubular Bells 2003 by Mike Oldfield
"Russian", from the album <|°_°|> by Caravan Palace
Nik Russian, the perpetrator of a con committed in 2002
The South African name for a variety of Kielbasa sausage
Something related to Ruthenia
Ruthenians
Ruthenian language
Something related to the Russian Empire or Soviet Union
Soviet people
East Slavs
All-Russian nation

See also

Russia (disambiguation)
Rus (disambiguation)
Rossiysky (disambiguation)
Russian River (disambiguation)
Rusyn (disambiguation)
Soviet (disambiguation)
The Russian People, 1942 play
Rushen (disambiguation)

Language and nationality disambiguation pages